Laelaroa is a genus of moths in the subfamily Lymantriinae. The genus was erected by Hering in 1926. Both species are known from Nigeria.

Species
Laelaroa flavimargo Hering, 1926
Laelaroa fulvicosta (Hampson, 1910

References

Lymantriinae